The 5000 metres race walk is a racewalking event. The event is competed as a track race and was part of the athletics programme for men at the IAAF World Indoor Championships in Athletics until 1993.  It is also an event in the World Masters Athletics Championships, and is a World record event.

Athletes must always keep in contact with the ground and the supporting leg must remain straight until the raised leg passes it. 5000 meters is 3.11 miles.

World records
IAAF just ratified world records for men's indoor marks. On February 14, 1995, Mikhail Shchennikov of Russia set the 5,000 m race walk world indoor record in Moscow in a time of 18:07.08. The faster all-time men's best outdoor mark is held by Hatem Ghoula of Tunisia, at 18:05.49. The all-time women's best 5,000 m race-walk mark was set outdoor and is held by Eleonora Giorgi of Italy, at 20:01.80.

All-time top 25 (outdoor)
+ = en route to 10,000m performance
h = hand timing

Men
Correct as of February 2022.

Notes
Below is a list of other times equal or superior to 18:39.65:
–

Women
Correct as of February 2022.

Notes
Below is a list of other times equal or superior to 20:22.75:
Gillian O'Sullivan also walked 20:13.13 (2003).
Kerry Saxby-Junna also walked 20:13.29 (1996), 20:17.19 (1990), 20:22.75 (1996).
Sabine Krantz also walked 20:27.47 (2004).

All-time top 25 (indoor)
+ = en route to 10,000m performance
h = hand timing

Men
Correct as of February 2022.

Notes
Below is a list of other times equal or superior to 18:39.01:
Mikhail Shchennikov also walked 18:15.91 (1989), 18:23.55 (1991).
Grigoriy Kornev also walked 18:23.10 (1992).
Ivano Brugnetti also walked 18:23.47 (2009).
Giovanni De Benedictis also walked 18:23.60 (1991).
Tom Bosworth also walked 18:28.70 (2018).

Women
Correct as of April 2021.

International medallists

African Championships

References

Racewalking distances